Anna Bukis (born 8 September 1953) is a former Polish female athlete. She represented Poland at the 1980 Summer Olympics.

See also 
 Poland at the 1980 Summer Olympics

References 

1953 births
Living people
People from Wałcz
Sportspeople from West Pomeranian Voivodeship
Polish female middle-distance runners
Olympic athletes of Poland
Athletes (track and field) at the 1980 Summer Olympics
Polish female athletes
Skra Warszawa athletes
20th-century Polish women
21st-century Polish women